Futebol Clube do Uíge is an Angolan sports club from the province of Uíge.

The club is one of the debutants of Girabola, the Angolan top division league, having participated in the first three editions.

League positions

Manager history and performance

Players

External links
 Profile at girabola.com

References

Football clubs in Angola
Sports clubs in Angola